Harith Lim (born 11 April 1970) is an professional Singaporean darts player who plays in the Professional Darts Corporation events.

Career
He first came into prominence in 1986, when he won the BDO World Youth Masters, defeating Rowan Barry of Australia in the final. He is mainly seen on the soft tip circuit, but has appeared in some steel tip action. He Runner-Up the number 4 seed of 1987 BDO World Youth Championship defeating champion 1986 Mark Day and losing to Rowan Barry of Australia. 

He has represented Singapore along with Paul Lim (no relation) in eight PDC World Cup of Darts tournaments, with their biggest success being in the 2017 tournament when they defeated the top seeds Scotland (consisting of Gary Anderson and Peter Wright), then knocked out the Spanish pairing of Cristo Reyes and Antonio Alcinas, before losing the quarter-final to Belgium, although Harith defeated Ronny Huybrechts in his singles match, before he and Paul lost to Kim and Ronny in the doubles.

He now played in every dartslive soft tip events every year (The World, Dartslive Open, Taiwan Pro). The biggest achievement was in 2017 The World Stage 1 USA, where he got 2nd place against Alex Reyes of USA. He has a lot of sponsors for 2019 that includes Cosmo Darts, Fit Flight, Fit Point Plus, Dartslive, Zansinryu, Restar, Doron, Jiyu, Forest Darts, The Stage, & Craft Darts Bistro. He will play along with his friend (Paul Lim) in the upcoming PDC World Cup of Darts representing Singapore. His personal darts (Goldfinger 1 & 2) are sold globally including soft tip dan steel tip, he has his own personalised darts flight which are sold globally too.

He held many coaching clinic locally in Singapore mainly at his sponsored darts place, his aim is to improve darts in Singapore and promote dartslive globally as Dartslive Official Player.

Harith's 2019 The World Schedule as follows:

1. Stage 1 Malaysia - April 28th
2. Stage 2 France - June 16th
3. Stage 3 Japan - August 24th
4. Stage 4 Taichung - September 15th
5. Stage 5 Hongkong - December 7th

Harith's 2019 SEA Tour Schedule as follows:

1. Stage 1 Kuala Lumpur - April 26th
2. Stage 2 Johor Bahru - July 27th
3. Stage 3 Sabah - TBC
4. Stage 4 Penang - TBC
5. Stage 5 Singapore - TBC

Performance timeline

PDC

BDO

References

External links
Profile and stats on Darts Database

1970 births
Living people
Singaporean darts players
Professional Darts Corporation associate players
PDC World Cup of Darts Singaporean team
Singaporean sportspeople of Chinese descent